Grab Holdings Inc., commonly known as Grab, is a Singaporean multinational technology company. It is the developer of the Grab super-app, which provides users with transportation, food delivery and digital payments services via a mobile app. Grab currently operates in Singapore, Malaysia, Cambodia, Indonesia, Myanmar, the Philippines, Thailand and Vietnam. It is Southeast Asia's first decacorn, and the biggest technology startup in the region. 

Founded by Anthony Tan and Tan Hooi Ling in 2012 as the MyTeksi app based in Kuala Lumpur, Malaysia, it expanded the next year as GrabTaxi. It has since expanded into other services, following the super-app model. In 2014, it moved its headquarters to Singapore and rebranded as "Grab".

History

Founding and expansion
The idea of creating a taxi-booking mobile app for Southeast Asia, similar to those being pioneered in the US, first came from Anthony Tan (Chen Bingyao) while he was at Harvard Business School. Motivated to make taxi rides safer in Malaysia, Tan launched the "My Teksi" app in Malaysia in 2012 together with Tan Hooi Ling, another Harvard graduate. MyTeksi was started with an initial grant of US$25,000 from Harvard Business School and Anthony Tan's personal capital.

GrabTaxi expanded to the Philippines in August 2013, and to Singapore and Thailand in October of the same year. In 2014, Grab in partnership with HDT Holdings, introduced 100 BYD e6 electric taxis in Singapore to form the biggest e-taxi fleet in Southeast Asia. In 2014, GrabTaxi further continued its growth and expansion to new countries: first launching in Ho Chi Minh City, Vietnam, in February, and Jakarta in Indonesia in June. In November 2014, GrabTaxi launched its first GrabBike service in Ho Chi Minh City as a trial service.

By 2015, GrabBike's motorcycle service rides had spread throughout Vietnam and Indonesia. GrabBike also provides medical insurance for their passengers and drivers. In February 2015, the company launched GrabCar+ (a service that provides a fleet of higher-end cars) in the Philippines. In November 2015, Grab launched GrabExpress courier service.

Rebranding and additional services
In January 2016, GrabTaxi was rebranded as "Grab" with a new, redesigned logo. In October 2016, Grab added an in-app instant messaging feature called "GrabChat" to allow simple communication between riders and drivers and translate messages if the set languages of the driver and passenger are different. In December 2016, Grab launched the GrabRewards rewards programme and GrabShare taxi and car-sharing services.

In February 2017, Grab launched the GrabCoach service for booking large passenger vehicles. In March 2017, Grab introduced GrabFamily for young children below 7 years old, to fulfill regulations where children under 1.35 metres must be placed on a child booster seat or child restraint. Later that month, Grab launched a simplified flat-fare structure, JustGrab.

In March 2018, Grab merged with Uber's Southeast Asian operations. As part of the acquisition, Grab took over Uber's assets and operations, including UberEats, which led to Grab's expansion of food delivery services. Grab also launched their eScooter rental service known as GrabWheels in March 2018.

In April 2017, Grab confirmed the acquisition of Indonesian online payment startup Kudo. The Kudo platform was integrated with Grab's payment system and was Grab's initial step into expanding fintech services. In November 2017, Grab launched GrabPay payment service as a digital payment service among third-party merchants, allowing users to use the app for purchases outside of ride-hailing.

In Jan 2018, Grab acquired financial technology firm iKaaz Software Pvt Ltd and which drives the Grab’s super app’s all payment transactions across all the South East Asian countries.

In May 2018, Grab launched GrabFood food delivery service. In October 2018, Grab launched GrabExpress courier service. In 2018, Grab also launched Grab Financial, a financial arm of the company which offers payment, insurance, and financing services. In November 2018, Grab invested in Indonesian conglomerate Lippo Group's Ovo platform. Ovo is Indonesia's leading digital e-payment platform. In December 2018, Grab launched GrabClub subscription programme.

Headquarters and product launches
In January 2019, Grab announced that it will build a new Singapore headquarters in one-north as it expands its operations. The headquarters will support a total of 3,000 employees.

In February 2019, the company launched GrabPet in Singapore. Under the new service, passengers with pets will be allocated to Grab drivers who have received training in pet handling and welcome animals in their vehicles.

In April 2019, Grab launched its first cloud kitchen (called GrabKitchen) in Indonesia under its food delivery service. 50 GrabKitchens were set up in six Southeast Asian countries within a year. Grab also launched their super app in April 2019 to consolidate its online services into one platform, as well as launching Hotels and Tickets.

In July 2019, Grab announced that it will set up a second headquarters in Jakarta, Indonesia. The company launched "Grab for Good", a social impact program, in September 2019. It partnered with Microsoft to help people in Southeast Asia to access digital literacy programs and certificates.

A month later, Grab, co-branded with Mastercard, launched a numberless payment card (being the first in Asia).

In February 2020, Grab launched GrabCare for healthcare workers in Singapore, starting with 24-hour services to Tan Tock Seng Hospital and National Centre for Infectious Diseases. This came after reports of increased discrimination due to the COVID-19 pandemic, making it difficult for healthcare workers to get rides. Grab also expanded its GrabMart and GrabAssistant services to more cities and countries to meet increased demand for online food and grocery deliveries. To support its driver- and merchant-partners during the outbreak, Grab committed US$40 million to relief initiatives across Southeast Asia.

Marriott International partnered with Grab to cover about 600 restaurants and bars in Singapore, Indonesia, Malaysia, the Philippines, Vietnam and Thailand which would be added to the GrabFood delivery platform. In November 2020, Grab announced the launch of its Tech Center in Jakarta, Indonesia for micro, small and medium enterprises (MSMEs). In December 2020, Grab was granted a digital bank licence from Singapore together with Singtel. The Grab-Singtel consortium is known as GXS Bank, and Grab holds a 60% stake.

Public listing and partnerships
The A.S. Watson Group began partnering with Grab at the beginning of 2021 to expand its online presence in Southeast Asia through the Singapore, Indonesia, Malaysia, Thailand, Vietnam and Philippines markets. In March 2021, Grab partnered with the Don Quijote discount store chain to deliver everyday goods such as food and cosmetics to customers in Southeast Asia. The next month, Grab announced plans to go public through a SPAC merger with Altimeter Growth Corp., for $39.6 billion. It was reported to be the largest blank-check merger at the time.

GrabPay formed a partnership with Stripe in May 2021 to include GrabPay Wallet as a payment option and connect merchants to Grab's users in Southeast Asia. In July 2021, Indonesia's Emtek Group invested $375 million into Grab's Indonesian business unit to accelerate digital adoption of small and medium businesses within the country. That same month, Grab expanded its buy now, pay later deferred payment options through an extended partnership with Adyen which was first announced in 2016.

In November 2021, Grab partnered with McDonald's in Singapore to integrate GrabExpress, GrabPay and GrabRewards with the restaurant's online and in-store ordering. The company acquired Malaysia's Jaya Grocer by the end of 2021, buying all the grocery chain's ordinary shares and 75 percent of its preference shares. It was Grab's largest acquisition since it took control of Ovo.

Grab debuted on Nasdaq in December 2021 following a SPAC with Altimeter Growth Corp., where shares opened at $13.06 but declined to $8.75 when the first day of trading began. It closed at $7.22 with a market cap of approximately $27 billion a month later. On 3 March 2022, Grab released its first quarterly results, reporting a $3.4 billion annual loss for 2021.

In March 2022, fuel shortages in Vietnam led to increased gasoline prices, and several ride-hailing platforms raised their prices to transfer the increased cost to consumers. In the same month, Grab also introduced a temporary driver fee in Singapore to help its drivers defray higher operating costs caused by the rise in fuel prices. That same month, the company announced that GrabFood, GrabPay, GrabGifts and its delivery system would be introduced at Starbucks in six markets, including Thailand, Singapore, Malaysia, Indonesia, Vietnam, and the Philippines.

In June 2022, the company introduced GrabMaps mapping and location technology for use in "hyperlocal" routes in Southeast Asian cities. The next month, it announced a programme under its GrabForGood Fund to award more than 2,000 scholarships and bursaries annually to the countries Grab operates in. GXS Bank, a Grab-Singtel operation, became the first retail digital bank in the region launching a savings account for employees of Grab and Singtel. Grab also announced a partnership with Coca-Cola to increase each company's distribution network in the region.

Funding 
Grab's investors include venture and hedge funds, automobile companies and other ride-hailing firms. Investors include Japan's Softbank Group and MUFG, Booking Holdings, Toyota and Microsoft.

In April 2014, the company secured more than US$10 million in series A funding from Vertex Ventures Southeast Asia & India. The company proceeded to raise another US$15 million in series B funding in May 2014, led by Chinese venture capital firm GGV Capital, with participation from Qunar and Vertex Venture Holdings. In October 2014, the company raised US$65 million in series C funding from US-based hedge fund Tiger Global, GGV Capital, and Venture Vertex Holdings. In December 2014, Grab managed to raise US$250 million in series D funding, invested in full by SoftBank Corp (now SoftBank Group), which Grab claimed to be the largest investment made into a Southeast Asian internet company on public record. In August 2015, Grab raised US$350 million in series E funding round from a range of investors including Didi Kuadi (now Didi Chuxing) and China Investment Corporation (CIC). In September 2016, Grab raised another US$750 million in series F funding from SoftBank, Didi, and Honda. In August 2017, Grab raised US$2.5 billion in series G funding from SoftBank, Didi, and Toyota.
As of March 2018, Grab was valued at US$6 billion.

In October 2018, Grab raised another $200 million from Booking Holdings (formerly known as Priceline).

In December 2018 the company announced the plans to hold Series H of funding. The total amount of funding is expected to reach $6.5 billion.

In April 2019, Grab and Central Group co-invest in 1.8 billion baht to launch the first MEGA O2O ‘Grab x Central: Eat, Shop, Nonstop’

In February 2020, the company announced it had raised a total of $856 million in two tranches: $706 million from Mitsubishi UFJ Financial Group, Inc and $150 million from TIS INTEC, an IT solutions business out of Japan.

In January 2021, Grab Financial Group, the company's financial services unit, raised more than $300 million from South Korea's Hanwha Asset Management.

Operations 

Grab started out as a taxi-hailing app, and has extended its products to include ride-hailing, food, grocery and package delivery, and financial services.

The Grab app assigns taxis and private hire cars to nearby commuters through a location-sharing system. Grab has a food delivery service GrabFood and on-demand delivery services GrabExpress, GrabMart and GrabAssistant. Grab's fintech services include payments, insurance, micro-investment and financing to consumers, micro-entrepreneurs and small businesses through its Grab Financial Group. Grab has a B2B marketplace with ads creation and business insights tools via GrabMerchant. It also has a B2B service called GrabDefence, which was developed as a fraud detection and prevention toolkit to third parties.

Number of users 
In May 2014, GrabTaxi said it had 1.2 million downloads. At around June 2013, it claimed to be making one booking every eight seconds, or 10,000 a day, representing sixteen-fold growth within a year. In November 2017, Grab reached one billion rides with 66 concurrent rides in one second across seven countries, occupying 95% market share in the third-party taxi-hailing market and 72% in the private vehicle hailing market. The company also claimed to have two million driving partners, 68 million mobile app downloads, and 3.5 million daily rides. In December 2018, Grab claimed to have served 920 million kilometres worth of rides to its users that year.

As of April 2021, Grab is reported to have more than 214 million app downloads and operations in more than 400 cities. The company has more than 500 deaf and hearing-impaired driver partners. It also has other individuals with disabilities, including some with cerebral palsy, on its platform.

The COVID-19 pandemic has reportedly increased Grab usage of its on-demand delivery, for example, Grab reported the successful onboarding of over 600,000 new merchants across Southeast Asia in 2020. As of December 2020, Grab had 5 million registered driver partners, 2 million merchant partners and 2 million GrabKios agents in Indonesia. The company announced that it would create an endowment fund of $275 million in April 2021 for its drivers and deliverers including education scholarships, life insurance and e-learning programs.

Research and development 
As part of its research and development, Grab invests in local technology talent in several countries and different continents. The company improves its services and technological capabilities in AI, mapping, and other technologies through its centres in Singapore, Beijing, Seattle, Bangalore, Ho Chi Minh, Jakarta and Kuala Lumpur. In 2018, Grab and the National University of Singapore launched an artificial intelligence lab to examine transportation in Southeast Asia in a joint investment of $6 million.

The company announced Tech for Good Institute (TFGI), a nonprofit think tank researching Southeast Asia's digital economy, in October 2021 along with the release of its first report titled "Platform Economy: Southeast Asia's Digital Growth Catalyst".

Incidents 
Cases of Grab drivers harassing their customers and the #MeToo movement in the United States and other countries have also recently emboldened women in Indonesia to speak out against harassment by Grab drivers, such as when a driver asks for personal information or sends them unsolicited messages after a trip.

On 23 September 2016, a female passenger in Singapore was sexually assaulted by an elderly GrabCar driver after she fell asleep during the ride. The driver was jailed for 16 months the following year. On 25 March 2017, a female passenger in Singapore was assaulted by a Grab driver. The driver was subsequently suspended by his taxi company from call bookings, although he was still allowed to pick up passengers on the streets. In May, a GrabCar driver in Chiang Mai, Thailand was arrested for sexual assault. In response, Grab issued a statement and said it "would not tolerate physical violence or verbal abuse".

Disputes have occurred between Grab drivers and local taxi operators as taxi drivers complained about a decline in their passenger numbers and income since Grab (and its competitor Uber) began to gain foothold in their areas. Until December 2016, around 65 assault cases towards GrabBike drivers by local taxibike drivers have been reported in Ho Chi Minh City, Vietnam. Much violence has erupted between Grab drivers and motorbike taxis in two major cities of Hanoi and Ho Chi Minh City in Vietnam with another 47 assaults cases recorded in 2017. Grab drivers and passengers in Kuala Lumpur have also been the subject of harassment from local taxi drivers.

On 4 March 2017, a drunk foreign man reportedly attacked a GrabCar driver in Singapore. The man was then arrested and jailed two weeks for his offence. On 26 October, a Grab driver was killed in Pasay, Philippines by a suspect disguised as a legitimate passenger, who subsequently fled with the victim's vehicle and personal belongings. The suspect finally surrendered to police two weeks later and confessed that he accidentally killed the latter after the victim refused to give his money. Claims out of Chiang Mai in November 2018 accuse Grab of pushing tuk-tuk renters and drivers out of business, which also resulted in violent encounter with enranged tuk-tuk driver in earlier October.

In order to reduce the number of incidents between passengers and drivers, Grab has implemented a number of safety features. Grab installed an emergency button in the app in 2018. Later the same year, Grab rolled out a telematics program to encourage safe driving behaviour for its drivers. In 2019, Grab began asking passengers to take a selfie before riding for identify verification.

In light of COVID-19, Grab announced in April 2020 that top management salaries would be slashed by 20 percent and employees were encouraged to take up voluntary no-pay leave in an effort to manage cost. It was further announced in June 2020 that Grab would be cutting 360 employees, which was just under 5 percent of the total headcount then across their South East Asia offices.

Regulation 
In the Philippines, GrabCar was fully legalised after being accredited as a Transportation Network Company (TNC) by the Land Transportation Franchising and Regulatory Board (LTFRB) in 2015. In 2016, Grab motorbike taxi services of Grab and Uber were suspended on claims the services are breaking local rules and clashing with registered transport companies. Further crackdown on the services was continued in early 2017 when a Thai transport official asked the government to ban them although little efforts being done as both services have gain popularity among Thais and foreign visitors in the country. In 2019, it was reported that the Thai government is taking steps to legalise Grab taxi services.

In Singapore, laws that legalised the service were passed in February 2017. A few months later, the Land Transport Authority (LTA) in Singapore introduced a new regulation requiring private hire cars to have Private Hire Car Driver's Vocational Licence (PDVL) which took effect in July 2017.

On 4 April 2017, the Malaysian government tabled amendments to existing transport laws that would regulate transport application services and protect drivers from harassment. Through the amendment, Grab and Uber vehicles were classified as public service vehicles as part of the move to legalise both services in its efforts to transform the country's public transport services. The amendments were passed by the Parliament of Malaysia on 28 July 2017, which directly legalised both services to operate in the country. 

In 2017, the Vietnamese Ministry of Transport set to review the legal status of both Grab and Uber to ensure a fair business environment for firms. A draft of a new circular was submitted in early 2018 that includes regulations for passenger transport (by car) through software such as Grab. In early 2020, a decree was passed to legalise Grab and other ride-hailing platforms in Vietnam.

In Cambodia and Singapore, Grab supported local governments in traffic management and infrastructure development through its data and technology. In Malaysia, Grab has also received the support of the Malaysian Public Land Transport Commission (SPAD) when the government department introduced the use of technology using the GrabTaxi applications to enhance the efficiency of taxi drivers in Malaysia. The company is working with the government department to improve the image of taxi drivers in the country by making it safer and more convenient to hail a taxi.

Grab has also partnered the authorities to build more environmentally sustainable transport networks. It co-launched an Electric Vehicle (EV) Ecosystem Roadmap with the Indonesian government to accelerate electric vehicle adoption. Grab supports local governments in Malaysia, Philippines, Myanmar in promoting road safety and combating crimes through its network of drivers and technology on its app, such as facial recognition. The company also promotes food safety in collaboration with the Vietnamese authorities. The company has agreements with authorities in Philippines and Indonesia to promote the growth and recovery of the tourism sector. It was also appointed by the Malaysian government as an official partner to drive e-wallet adoption among citizens. During the COVID-19 pandemic, it partnered governments in Malaysia, Philippines, Thailand and Indonesia to enable farmers and fisheries to sell their products and process digital payments on the Grab app.

Recognition
From 2017 to 2020, Grab ranked as a CNBC Disruptor 50 as one of the fastest growing and most innovative start-ups. Tan was recognised in the 2017 Bloomberg 50 for Grab's growth in the region and also ranked among the 100 Most Creative People in Business by Fast Company in 2018.

Grab ranked second among the 50 most innovative companies of 2019 by Fast Company. In 2020, Grab was also one of the 50 companies listed on Fortune's "Change the World" list, for addressing social issues through its services during the COVID-19 pandemic. In 2020, Grab was also listed on The Fintech Power 50 annual guide, for simplifying financial services for the unbanked and underbanked. The founders were ranked amongst "The World's 50 Greatest Leaders" by Fortune for 2021.

References

External links
Official website

Transport companies established in 2012
Retail companies established in 2012
500 Startups companies
Ridesharing companies
Road transport in Singapore
Online companies of Singapore
Online food ordering
Transport companies of Singapore
Singaporean companies established in 2012
Singaporean brands
Softbank portfolio companies
Companies listed on the Nasdaq
Special-purpose acquisition companies
2021 mergers and acquisitions